The Caudron C.92 was a passenger transport built by Caudron in 1925, powered by a  Lorraine-Dietrich 12D. Only one was built, and it was discarded in July 1934.

Design and development

The C.92, first flown in 1925, was a close but more powerful relative of the C.91 from 1924. It was a two bay biplane with pairs of upright, parallel interplane struts between its wings, which were rectangular plan out to angled tips. The upper wing was supported centrally on four short cabane struts. The lower wing had a slightly shorter span, 10% smaller chord and, unlike the upper wing, had light dihedral. Only the upper wing carried ailerons. Structurally, the wings were built from spruce and plywood.

Its  liquid-cooled upright V-12 Lorraine-Dietrich 12D was neatly cowled in the nose, with twin cylindrical Lamblin radiators externally mounted below it. Behind the engine the fuselage was flat-sided with a rectangular section, starting with a  baggage space. Above it, the pilot and navigator sat side by side in open cockpits. The passenger cabin behind the baggage space accommodated four, each with their own windows and electric heating. Entry was via a port side door.

The tail of the C.92 was conventional, with a tailplane on the top of the fuselage and generous elevators of similar plan as the wings apart from an elevator cut-out for rudder movement. Its long vertical tail had a blunted triangular profile and a rudder that extended to the keel.

The axle was bungee cord-sprung to a pair of vertical landing legs, each braced with a V-strut. Its wooden tailskid was also bungee sprung.

Very little is known about its history, though a photograph taken before the end of 1925 shows it marked "9" as if for a contest.

Specifications

References

C.092
Biplanes
Single-engined tractor aircraft
1920s French airliners